Donoor is a small village in the Karimnagar district of Telangana. It is a small gram-panchayat with a population of just around 2500. It is around 8 kilometers from the temple town Dharmapuri.

Infrastructure

Health care
A small government-funded primary care center supervised by a trained health care worker provides health education and first aid services. It does have a few registered medical practitioners (RMP) who help provide first aid. However it is a health care under-served area, with the nearest physician services available some 8 kilometers away. Lack of proper transportation services makes the availability of timely health care difficult.

There are very well educated people who can trace back their roots to this tiny village. This village can benefit from the services and contributions of all those who can trace back their roots to it.

Education
Donoor has a government upper primary school, which provides education for around 224 students. There are five secondary grade teachers and one ancillary staff.

References

Villages in Karimnagar district